Carulaspis is a genus of true bugs belonging to the family Diaspididae.

The species of this genus are found in Europe.

Species:

Carulaspis atlantica 
Carulaspis giffardi 
Carulaspis juniperi 
Carulaspis minima 
Carulaspis silvestrii 
Carulaspis taxicola 
Carulaspis visci

References

Diaspididae